Patrick Henry Boland (October 12, 1906 - July 2, 1971) was a head coach in the AAFC for one season in 1946. He was the Interim coach for the Chicago Rockets. He was also a Line Coach at Iowa.

Early life
Boland was born on October 12, 1906 in Duluth, Minnesota. He went to college at Minnesota.

College Coaching Career
He was a Freshmen coach at Minnesota in 1932. In 1937 he became a Line Coach for the Iowa Hawkeyes. He was coach there from 1937 to 1942.

Professional Coaching Career
In 1946 he became the Line coach for the Chicago Rockets of the AAFC. He became the Interim coach a few weeks later. As a coach he had a 2-3-1 record.

Later life
He later became a recruiter for the University of Iowa and the University of Miami. He died at 64 in 1971.

References

1906 births
1971 deaths
People from Minnesota
Iowa Hawkeyes football coaches